Luule is an Estonian feminine given name from the Estonian language word luule, meaning "poetry".

As of 1 January 2022, 1,064 women in Estonia have the first name Luule, making it the 170th most popular female name in the country. The name is most common in the 80-84 age group, and most commonly found in Valga County, where 17.27 per 10,000 inhabitants of the county bear the name.   

Individuals bearing the name Luule include:

 (born 1953), theatre scholar and literary scholar 
Luule Käis (born 1929), lawyer and legal scholar (:et)
Luule Komissarov (born 1942), actress
 (born 1956), demographer
Luule Tull (born 1942), motorcycle racer
Luule Viilma (1950–2002), physician, esotericist and practitioner of alternative medicine

References

Feminine given names
Estonian feminine given names